Alcamo is a city in Italy.

Alcamo may also refer to:

 Alcamo Marina
 Alcamo wine
 Joseph Alcamo